John Wiik (born March 28, 1972) is an American politician who has served in the South Dakota Senate from the 4th district since 2017. He previously served in the South Dakota House of Representatives from the 4th district from 2015 to 2017.

References

1972 births
Living people
People from Ortonville, Minnesota
Republican Party members of the South Dakota House of Representatives
Republican Party South Dakota state senators
21st-century American politicians